Eskibağ can refer to:

 Eskibağ, Çermik
 Eskibağ, Gündoğmuş